Jezioro Bodeńskie (English: Lake Constance) is a 1986 Polish film directed by Janusz Zaorski. It won the Golden Leopard at the 1986 Locarno International Film Festival.

Synopsis
The film tells the story of a Polish man who spent time in an internment camp during the Second World War, in the city of Konstanz, on the Swiss-German border. Many years later, he revisits the location and meets other internees he knew there, including several women with whom he had romantic affairs.

Cast and characters
 Krzysztof Pieczyński as the protagonist
 Małgorzata Pieczyńska as Suzanne
 Joanna Szczepkowska as Janka
 Maria Pakulnis as Renee Bleist
 Gustaw Holoubek as Roullot
 Andrzej Szczepkowski as Thomson
 Henryk Borowski as Wildermayer
 Krzysztof Zaleski as Harry Markowski
 Krzysztof Gosztyła as MacKinley
 Wojciech Wysocki as Vilbert
 Jacek Sas-Uhrynowski as Cleont
 Krzysztof Kowalewski as Pociejak
 Jan Kociniak as Klaus
 Janusz Bukowski as Max Pfitzner
 Adam Ferency as Jasiek Paluch
 Grzegorz Wons as Jean Ledoix
 Krzyś Paszkowski sa Krupski
 Wojciech Paszkowski as Krupski

References

External links
 

1986 films
Golden Leopard winners
Polish drama films
Films directed by Janusz Zaorski
Lake Constance